Nanyang Academy of Fine Arts (NAFA); (Standard Chinese: 南洋艺术学院;) is a publicly-funded post-secondary arts institution, a constituent college of the University of the Arts Singapore (UAS) by 2024 along with the LASALLE College of the Arts in Singapore. 

NAFA offers courses at the secondary diploma and bachelor's degree levels. The NAFA diploma programmes provides comprehensive arts and design education appropriate of Singapore's polytechnic-level for students who had successfully completed their secondary school education, which is 10 years of studies in Singapore. As an industry-oriented alternative to a broader-based junior college education in Singapore, NAFA graduates in Singapore are sought after for work or many continue to complete university degrees. NAFA in Singapore admit the majority of their students after secondary school, normally at the age of 16–17, which is after ten years of formal education, similar to the other polytechnics in Singapore. Diplomas in a specialised area of study, for example 3D Design, are awarded after completing 3-years of full-time studies and industry internship.

Demand for its programmes has remained strong, and the school projects a student population of 3,300 by 2024. NAFA offers full-time diploma and degree programmes across three faculties: Faculty of Art and Design comprising the School of Fine Art, School of 3D Design, School of Design and Media, as well as the School of Fashion Studies; Faculty of Performing Arts comprising School of Dance, School of Music, and School of Theatre; Faculty of Interdisciplinary Practices comprising School of Arts Management and School of Interdisciplinary Arts.

The institution also offers a full range of government tuition fees subsidised, 2 to 3-years undergraduate degree programmes for NAFA's diploma graduates in partnership with the prestigious University of the Arts London in England, United Kingdom. Students with GCE A-level certificates as well as those without a relevant Singapore's polytechnic diplomas will be allowed to enrol in NAFA-UAL's degree programmes for the first time. Diploma courses are aligned with the degree courses offered in partnership with top universities in the world, including Royal College of Music, London (named as the world’s leading institution for performing arts in QS World University Rankings 2022).

NAFA has nurtured 13 recipients of the Cultural Medallion – Singapore's highest accolade bestowed on art practitioners who have significantly impacted arts and culture. Another 15 alumni have been presented the Young Artist Award.

History
NAFA was founded in a two-storey Geylang shophouse in 1938 by Lim Hak Tai, with its first batch made up of 14 students.

In March 2021, Minister for Education Lawrence Wong announced that Singapore's first arts university will be established in an alliance between the Nanyang Academy of Fine Arts and LASALLE College of the Arts. The formation of the University of the Arts Singapore (UAS) will see both colleges under the umbrella university be given degree-awarding powers independent of their current foreign partners, where the current long-distance degrees are issued through foreign universities. Singaporeans and permanent residents enrolled in the approved degree programmes at the university of the arts will pay subsidised fees, comparable to the autonomous universities in Singapore.

Academics 
Apart from the regular academic requirements, entry into the diploma programme also requires students to fulfil their artistic and design potential aspect through portfolio submission, admission test or audition. The intakes especially for the furniture design major from the 3D design course are deliberately kept small so that each student gets focused attention. Selection is competitive and is subject to the availability of places too.

Diploma students can advance into any Singaporean universities strictly depending on the diploma major the student graduated with, for example the National University of Singapore (NUS) or the Singapore Management University. In 2020 with the opening of the new bachelor of landscape architecture course through the National University of Singapore, prospective students that graduated from NAFA's diploma in design (landscape and architecture) programme will be eligible for up to 28 advanced placement credits without any placement tests, into the bachelor of landscape architecture course.

Many students also opted for overseas universities upon graduation with the diploma, mostly in a related areas as their diploma studies such as fine arts, architecture, interior design, landscape, graphic design, fashion, music, and theatre, among others.  Other than Singapore's polytechnic-level diploma, Nanyang Academy of Fine Arts also collaborates with University of the Arts London to offer a government subsidised 2-years Bachelor's degree-level education for their diploma graduates, or 3-year bachelor's degrees for Singapore's GCE A level or other non-relevant Singapore's polytechnic diploma graduates.

Since 2006, Nanyang Academy of Fine Arts students are granted accelerated bachelor's degree programmes with Nanyang Technological University, meaning that diploma holders will have the option to pursue a direct honours degree over a shorter span of three years or less. Academy students can also apply for places in any faculty freely in the university with advanced placement through the signing ceremony for the memorandum of understanding.

NAFA's partnership with RCM for the bachelor of music programme was established in 2011 with an initial batch of 20 students. Since then, more than 200 students have graduated from the programme. The key design feature of the programme is the two-year degree top up to the existing NAFA Diploma in Music programme. In the final year of the programme, students in western music studies head to RCM for a 7-week placement in January, while those studying Chinese music attend their 10-week placement in September at the Central Conservatory of Music in Beijing. For students who are looking to pursue postgraduate studies, NAFA - RCM offers performance degree courses at the Master’s level in Singapore. The Master of Performance and Master of Composition route develops Western and Chinese instrumentalists' performance or composition skills to a high professional level through intensive training within 2 years (full time) or 3 years (part time).

Apart from regular diplomas, there is also a special 4-year diploma course where students will study for the first 3 years at the Nanyang Academy of Fine Arts and the final year at the National Institute of Education, from which students will graduate with a diploma in art education or a diploma in music education from NAFA and a diploma in art education or diploma in music education from the NIE. Graduates from this scheme will be deployed to teach art or music in primary schools.

Schools and campus location

Campuses
NAFA operates from four campuses along Bencoolen Street. All four campuses are located within walking distances apart in the same vicinity.

Campus one

NAFA Campus 1 is divided into 2 wings, Wing A & Wing B, with a linking bridge. It boasts a high-definition studio, a creative media studio for 3D animation and special effects, and audio-video production facilities.

Skylight studios allow painting in natural, evenly-distributed daylight. There are also photography studios equipped with studio flash systems and digital cameras and jewelry workshops with casting, processing and setting facilities, interior design material and project room, drafting studios and 3D model eorkshops and 3 art galleries with a total exhibition area of 850 sq m.

A 2-storey library is located at Wing A. It houses an impressive collection of arts-related publications and journals available for members, staff and students only. The Tanoto Foundation Centre for Southeast Asian Arts is located on the 7th floor. TFCSEA@NAFA, a website housing a full-text bilingual database of more than 100,000 pages of Southeast Asian arts materials was launched in 2011 to aid scholars and students' research in this area. Arts institutions and public members can join as members to access the materials online.

Campus two
This campus houses workshops for batik printing, textile development and embroidery design, drafting and draping, among other facilities, and houses the Fashion Studies Department.

Campus three
There is a plush 380-seat Lee Foundation Theatre with a rotating central platform on stage, an adjustable orchestra pit with superb acoustics and two Steinway model D grand pianos. The school's famous studio theatre or "black box" is also located here. Other facilities include a recital hall, soundproof music studios and dance studios.

Campus One Tower Block
The purpose-built NAFA Campus one tower block is located on top of the Bencoolen MRT station, adjacent to NAFA campus one. The new campus was built in 2017. The new building boast facilities such as state-of-the-art studios and classrooms, easing the school's previous space crunch.

Minister for Education Ong Ye Kung officially opened the Nanyang Academy of Fine Arts' campus one tower block during the school's 80th anniversary celebrations.

The $40-million block is the first expansion of its grounds since the institution moved to Bencoolen Street in 2004.

Notable alumni
Constance Lau - Singaporean actress
Julie Tan - Singaporean actress
Mohammad Din Mohammad, painter
Anthony Poon, Singaporean Artist
Isyana Sarasvati, Indonesian singer and songwriter
M. Nasir, Malaysian singer and songwriter
Chloe Chua, Singaporean violinist

Cultural Medallion recipients

Young Artist Award recipients

Image gallery

References

External links
 Official website
 UAS website

 
1938 establishments in Singapore
Educational institutions established in 1938
Education in Singapore